Ray Magee (31 January 1918 – 19 April 1999) was an Australian weightlifter. He competed in the men's heavyweight event at the 1948 Summer Olympics.

References

External links
 

1918 births
1999 deaths
Australian male weightlifters
Olympic weightlifters of Australia
Weightlifters at the 1948 Summer Olympics
Sportspeople from Sydney
Commonwealth Games medallists in weightlifting
Commonwealth Games silver medallists for Australia
Weightlifters at the 1950 British Empire Games
20th-century Australian people
Medallists at the 1950 British Empire Games